El Rey, Spanish for The King, may refer to:

Locations
El Rey Inn, Santa Fe, New Mexico
El Rey National Park in Argentina
El Rey Theatre, a live music venue in Los Angeles, California
El Rey archaeological site, a Mayan site in Cancun, Mexico

Companies
El Rey Chocolates, a Venezuelan chocolatier established in 1927
El Rey Network, an English language cable network for the Latino market that launched in 2013

Music
Tito Puente (1923–2000), American musician, songwriter and record producer nicknamed "El Rey"
El Rey (Tito Puente album), a 1984 album by Tito Puente on Concord Picante
El Rey (The King), a 1968 album by Tito Puente
El Rey: Bravo, a 1963 album by Tito Puente
"El Rey" (song), a Mexican song by José Alfredo Jiménez
Don Omar (born 1978), Puerto Rican reggaeton singer nicknamed "El Rey"
El Rey (The Wedding Present album), a 2008 album by The Wedding Present
El Rey, a 1990 album by Pete "El Conde" Rodríguez

Other uses
El Rey (film), a 2004 Colombian film directed by Antonio Dorado

See also

Elrey Borge Jeppesen (1907–1996), American aviation pioneer